Shawn Bosco Fernandes (born January 12, 1982), known by his stage name Shawn Desman, is a Canadian singer, songwriter, dancer, and television personality. Shawn was a staple of Canada's R&B scene in the 2000s and 2010s.

Early life
Shawn Desman attended St. Francis of Assisi Elementary School in Toronto. After discovering his passion for performing, Desman's parents encouraged him to pursue a career in music. From age nine to 16, he made four Portuguese albums under his legal name, Shawn Fernandes. In 1998, Shawn was in the Boomtang Boys video for their song "Squeezetoy" as a dancer. According to his own account, he adopted the name Desman because in his youth his friends referred to him as "Dez, man" – thus creating his artistic pseudonym Desman.

Career

2002–2005: Early beginnings 
At 18, Desman was signed to BMG Music Canada and started recording an album, which was released in 2002. The self-titled breakthrough album featured three top ten singles ("Shook", "Spread My Wings" and "Get Ready") on the Canadian charts. The album went on to achieve gold certification in Canada. The single, "Spread My Wings", is a cover of the unreleased group Vega, featuring Chilli of TLC. 

His follow-up album, Back for More garnered a Juno Award for Best R&B Recording which featured the number one hit single "Let's Go". After the release of his second album, BMG dropped him from the label. Undeterred and optimistic about his future, he was signed to Universal Music Canada.

2010–2013: Fresh, and producer work 
His 2010 album Fresh garnered two gold singles, one platinum single, Video of the Year at the Much Music Video Awards, Canadian Dance/Pop Song of the year at the Stylus Awards, as well as SOCAN Number 1 Award for Electric/Night Like This.

Shawn Desman is also a producer and has worked with various artists producing hit singles for Nick Carter, Kreesha Turner, Keshia Chanté as well as contestants on YTV's The Next Star where he produced the song (One More First Chance) for Brock Zanrosso in 2009 and "It Might Be You" for contestant Parker Schmidt in 2011.

2013–2018: Alive, and being dropped by Universal Music 
In 2013, Shawn Desman released his fourth studio album, Alive, along with an accompanying short film of the same name. The album spawned two hit singles; "Nobody Does It Like You" and "Dum Da Dum". But in 2015, Universal Music told him that they would be dropping Desman from the label to move in a different direction. In 2018, due to low ticket sales, a Shawn Desman concert in Wasaga Beach was made free for the public.

2020–present: Staging his comeback, and new single Maniac 
Just before the pandemic hit, Desman was coming to terms with the possibility that his music career was truly over. That's when he received a call from his best friend, Canadian country music singer Tebey, who suggested they collaborate on a project, which they called RadioClub, to help get him back into making music. With RadioClub, Desman released a dance remix of Rick Astley's song "Never Gonna Give You Up", which he said has been a huge success with 25 million streams. 

In July 2022, Shawn Desman performed at Drake's All Canadian North Stars concert at OVO Fest, featuring a dozen Canadian hip-hop and R&B artists. After announcing the show on Instagram, Desman got a call from Jamie Appleby, the owner of Wax Records, who told him this was his big chance. After the show, Drake approached him in the hallway outside of the green room, praising him for his performance and had encouraged him to continue making music. 

A few months later he released a new single called "Maniac", his first single since 2015’s “Obsession”.

In 2023, he participated in an all-star recording of Serena Ryder's single "What I Wouldn't Do", which was released as a charity single to benefit Kids Help Phone's Feel Out Loud campaign for youth mental health.

Personal life 
Desman is of Portuguese descent. He has two younger brother named Jonathan and Danny Fernandes. He is also a cousin to another Canadian singer Tyler Medeiros, who signed to Danny's former record label CP records.

In 2015, Desman's wife became ill, so he made the difficult decision to step away from his music career to focus on his family.

Accolades
Shawn Desman's eponymous debut album was certified Gold by the Canadian Recording Industry Association.
In 2006, won a Juno Award for "R&B/Soul Recording of the Year".
In 2011, won "Video of the year" at the Much Music Video Awards for his video "Electric/Night Like This".
In 2011, won Canadian Dance/Pop Single of the Year at the Stylus Awards.
In 2011, awarded SOCAN No. 1 Award for Electric/Night Like This reaching No. 1.
In 2013, ALIVE movie awarded Best Outstanding Short Film at Reel World Film Festival

Discography

Studio albums

Singles

Notes

Features
2003: "Movie Star (Remix)" Rascalz feat. Shawn Desman
2006: "All Eyes on Me" Puppet feat. Shawn Desman
2010: "Feel It" Danny Fernandes feat. Shawn Desman

Collaborations 
2009: "One More First Chance" (as producer for Brock Zanrosso on YTV's The Next Star)

Filmography
Get Over It (2001)
Honey (2003)
How She Move (2007)
The Next Step (2015)

References

External links
 
 
 
 
 
Shawn Desman MuchMusic page (archived 2009)

1982 births
Living people
21st-century Canadian male singers
Canadian dance musicians
Canadian hip hop singers
Canadian male dancers
Canadian male singer-songwriters
Canadian people of Portuguese descent
Canadian pop singers
Juno Award for R&B/Soul Recording of the Year winners
Musicians from Mississauga